Antithesis of Light is the third studio album by American funeral doom band Evoken, released on February 28, 2005.

Track listing

Credits 
 John Paradiso – vocals, guitars, bass
 Nick Orlando – guitars
 Vince Verkay – drums
 Denny Hahn – keyboards
 Chris Kuffner – session cello

References

External links 
 [ Allmusic review]

Evoken albums
2005 albums
Avantgarde Music albums